The Church of St. Helena is a parish of the Roman Catholic Church in the Archdiocese of New York. Its parish church is located at the intersection of Olmstead Avenue and Benedict Avenue, Bronx, New York City, in the Unionport neighborhood. It was established in 1940, and the church building was built in the same year and was designed by the prominent architectural firm of Eggers & Higgins.

References

External links 

Christian organizations established in 1940
Roman Catholic churches in the Bronx
Roman Catholic churches completed in 1940
Eggers & Higgins church buildings
20th-century Roman Catholic church buildings in the United States